Sushil Kumar Roongta  is the former Chairman of Steel Authority of India Ltd. (SAIL)(Aug 2006-May2010). SAIL is one of India's largest public sector companies. He is an alumnus of BITS Pilani and Indian Institute of Foreign Trade (IIFT).

He was also the first Chairman of International Coal Ventures Limited (ICVL) – a JV of five leading PSUs viz. SAIL, CIL, RINL, NMDC & NTPC.

He was a member of various Apex Chambers - Chairman of ‘Steel Committee’ of FICCI, member of National Council of CII and Advisory Council of ASSOCHAM. Mr. Roongta was also President of Institute for Steel Development & Growth.He is presently Mentor of Non ferrous metal committee of FICCI.

Mr. Roongta was a member of the Executive Committee of the World Steel Association - the Apex Body for formulation of policy for world steel.

Mr. Roongta is the recipient of a number of awards including [Standing conference of public enterprises|SCOPE Award for Excellence & Outstanding Contribution to the Public Sector Management] – Individual Category 2007-08 and IIM-JRD Tata award for excellence in Corporate Leadership in Metallurgical industries, 2016.

He has been part of various think tanks and is widely regarded as one of the principal experts in the field of metal, power and public sector turnarounds. He was Chairman of ‘Panel of Experts on reforms in Central Public sector enterprises’ constituted by Planning Commission, widely known as ‘Roongta Committee’, its report is taken as benchmark for Public sector Reforms today.

Under Mr. Roongta’s leadership, SAIL achieved new landmarks in physical and financial performance.  Operating at 115% of its rated capacity, it had posted a PBT of over Rs. 9,400 crores in FY’09 and emerged with second highest net profit amongst all steel producers of the world.

Mr Roongta has been and continues to be director on multiple corporate boards. He is also associated with educational institutions and Non profit organisations. He was chairman of Board of Governors of IIT-Bhubaneswar.

Career

Mr. Roongta started his career in 1972 as a marketing executive in SAIL. He held several vital positions in the marketing division of the company before being elevated to the SAIL Board as Director (Commercial) in 2004. He also headed HR, Corporate Planning and Raw Materials Division functions of the company as Director (Personnel).

He is also the first Chairman of International Coal Ventures Limited (ICVL) – a JV of five leading PSUs viz. SAIL, CIL, RINL, NMDC & NTPC.

Under Mr. Roongta’s leadership, SAIL has achieved new landmarks in physical and financial performance. SAIL is operating at 115% of its rated capacity, and has brought about continuous improvement in its productivity & cost competitiveness. It has posted a profit (before tax) to the tune of over Rs. 9400 crores in FY’09 making it a leading company in terms of profitability.

With initiatives taken by SAIL under the guidance of Mr. Roongta, SAIL’s net profit of Rs. 2813 cr. (US $570 million) during H1’09 was the highest among all steel producers in the world.

Awards and recognition
Roongta is a member of the Executive Committee of FICCI and is also Chairman of its ‘Steel Committee’, member of National Council of CII and Advisory Council of ASSOCHAM and is represented in several committees of CII viz., National Committee on Mining, CEOs Council on Manufacturing, National Committee on WTO & Trade Agreement and Apex Council on PSUs.  Mr. Roongta also heads the Institute for Steel Development & Growth (INSDAG) as its President.  He is a Council member of the All India Management Association (AIMA), Member of the General Body of BITS, Pilani and several other professional bodies.

Roongta has been appointed as the Chairman of the Board of Governors of the Indian Institute of Technology, Bhubaneswar starting 2 November 2012.

Roongta has been appointed as a member of the Executive Committee of the World Steel Association (WSA) w.e.f. Oct’09.  The Executive Committee of the WSA is the Apex Body in the steel industry which is responsible for discussion and formulation of policy for world steel. The committee consists of 15 members - CEOs of select world class steel producers.  Mr. Roongta will be the only CEO from India in this committee.

Roongta is the recipient of a number of awards including SCOPE Award for Excellence & Outstanding Contribution to the Public Sector Management – Individual Category 2007-08.

References

External links
 S K Roongta's profile on the SAIL Website

Living people
Businesspeople from Delhi
Rajasthani people
Year of birth missing (living people)